The Thames–Clyde Express was a named express passenger train operating on the Midland Main Line, Settle-Carlisle Railway and the Glasgow South Western Line between  and Glasgow St Enoch. Following the closure of St Enoch station in 1966, the service ran to  instead.

In September 1927, the London Midland & Scottish Railway gave the name to its morning services departing from London St Pancras and Glasgow St Enoch. After the service was speeded up in 1932, trains departed Glasgow at 09:30 and London at 10:00.

The route (from London) 

After another reversal there, the train crossed the Pennines to the scenic Settle-Carlisle route, still on former Midland Railway territory. Crossing into Scotland, the train used the former Glasgow and South Western Railway's Glasgow South Western Line into Glasgow St Enoch, the city's G&SWR terminus. The train could not compete for London-to-Scotland traffic with the faster trains travelling on the West Coast Main Line. Its route was longer and steeper, and Midland expresses could not ignore major population centres en route, especially Leicester, Sheffield and Leeds. In Scotland, it took a longer route in order to provide a service to Dumfries and Kilmarnock.

As a result, few travellers after the 1920s travelled the full length of the route.
The Thames–Clyde lost its title at the outbreak of World War II, in common with almost all named trains in the UK. However, the title was restored in September 1949 as part of the post-war return to normality.

In 1962, the Thames–Clyde took eight hours and 50 minutes for the complete journey, leaving London at 10.15, and then calling first at Leicester London Road at 11.52. Further stops were made at Trent and Chesterfield, before reaching Sheffield Midland station at 13.19 and Leeds City at 14.25 - so this latter stage of 39 miles took over an hour as a result of subsidence-induced speed restrictions. From there, the train ran non-stop to Carlisle (arrival 16.38).

The rival Royal Scot on the West Coast route stopped only twice and took seven hours, twenty minutes. However, the Thames–Clyde provided a useful service from the East Midlands and Yorkshire to Scotland.

Run down and cessation 
In 1964, The Waverley ceased to run during the winter, and so additional coaches for Edinburgh were carried on the Thames–Clyde. But the train then made additional stops on the Settle & Carlisle line which were otherwise served by The Waverley: Skipton, Hellifield,  and Appleby West railway station. In December 1967, Trent station was closed and so from New Years Day 1968, a further delay was added by a stop at Nottingham, which meant a reversal. In 1970, a short-lived Sunday diversion to Derby brought another reversal, although this had ceased by 1973. The train had acquired a bad reputation for slowness and unpunctuality.

Cessation of services 
The train lost its title in May 1974 when the West Coast Main Line was electrified to Glasgow, but the service continued to run until 1976.

References

Sources

Timetables used as sources
Passenger Timetable 1970 / 71 London Midland Region Publisher British Railways
Passenger Timetable 1973 / 74 London Midland Region Publisher British Railways

External links
Two pictures of the Thames–Clyde Express {dead link}

Named passenger trains of the London, Midland and Scottish Railway
Named passenger trains of British Rail
Railway services introduced in 1927